This article is about the particular significance of the year 1932 to Wales and its people.

Incumbents

Archbishop of Wales – Alfred George Edwards, Bishop of St Asaph
Archdruid of the National Eisteddfod of Wales
Pedrog (outgoing)
Gwili (incoming)

Events
25 January – Leif Jones is created Baron Rhayader.
1 March (Saint David's Day) – Members of Plaid Cymru on two occasions replace the Union Jack flying over Caernarfon Castle with a flag displaying the red Welsh Dragon. 
c. August – The Grand Pavilion, Porthcawl, is completed.
Plaid Cymru adopts self-government as its official policy.
Hilary Marquand’s economic surveys of South Wales highlight the depressed conditions in the area during the Great Depression in the United Kingdom.

Arts and literature
Frank Brangwyn completes the Empire Panels.
Welsh-language newspaper Y Cymro is launched.

Awards
National Eisteddfod of Wales (held in Port Talbot)
National Eisteddfod of Wales: Chair – D. J. Davies, "Mam"
National Eisteddfod of Wales: Crown – Thomas Eurig Davies, "A Ddioddefw a Orfu"

New books

English language
Margiad Evans – Country Dance
Elisabeth Inglis-Jones – Crumbling Pageant
Howard Spring – Darkie and Co.
Hilda Vaughan – The Soldier and the Gentlewoman
Francis Brett Young – The House Under the Water

Welsh language
Richard Ithamar Aaron – Hanes Athroniaeth
T. H. Parry-Williams – Canu Rhydd Cynnar
David Walters (Eurof) – Pwerau'r Deufyd

Music
W. Bradwen – Mab yr ystorm
Grace Williams 
Suite for orchestra
Two Psalms for contralto, harp and strings

Film
13 June – Port Talbot-born English actress Peg Entwistle signs a contract with RKO in the United States.
16 September – Peg Entwistle commits suicide by jumping from the letter "H" of the giant Hollywoodland sign.
20 October – Release of comedy horror The Old Dark House, set entirely in Wales but filmed wholly in Hollywood.
Edmund Gwenn appears in Tell Me Tonight, Money for Nothing, Condemned to Death, Love on Wheels, Lord Babs and Frail Women.

Broadcasting
The broadcasting committee of the Welsh Parliamentary Labour Party obtains agreement from the BBC to broadcast a fortnightly programme and religious content in the Welsh language.

Sport
Boxing
3 February – Jack Petersen beats Dick Power to take the Welsh heavyweight title.
23 May – Jack Petersen wins the British light-heavyweight title against Harry Crossley.
12 July – Jack Petersen wins the British heavyweight title against Reggie Meen.

Births
12 March – John Harris, dean of Brecon (died 2019)
20 March – Garfield Owen, Wales dual-code rugby international
6 April – Leon Eagles, actor (died 1997)
28 May – John Savage, prime minister of Nova Scotia (died 2003)
30 May – Ivor Richard, Baron Richard, politician (died 2018)
31 May – Glyn Davies, footballer (died 2013)
22 June – Mary Wynne Warner, mathematician (died 1998)
30 June – Derek Tapscott, footballer (died 2008)
10 July – Maureen Guy, mezzo-soprano (died 2015)
27 July – Dennis Callan, footballer (died 2006)
2 August – Kenneth Bowen, concert tenor (died 2018) 
12 August – Gwilym Jenkins, statistician and systems engineer (died 1982)
31 August – Colin Gale, footballer (died 2008)
9 September – Alice Thomas Ellis, born Ann Margaret Lindholm in Liverpool, novelist (died 2005)
8 October – Ray Reardon, snooker player
18 October – Don Devereux, dual-code rugby player (died 1995)
24 October – Allan Rogers, politician
16 November – Onllwyn Brace, Wales rugby union captain (died 2013)
21 November – Alvan Williams, footballer (died 2003)
1 December – Cissy Davies, Olympic gymnast
7 December – Elystan Morgan, politician
15 December – John Meurig Thomas, chemist (died 2020)
date unknown
Richard Cyril Hughes, historian

Deaths
27 February – Dicky Owen, Wales rugby union international, 55 (suicide)
3 March – Ernest Howard Griffiths, physicist, 80
10 April – Gwyn Thomas, cricketer, 41
14 May – John Hughes, composer of Cwm Rhondda, 58
27 May – M. C. Jones, racing driver, 37 (killed during qualification for Indianapolis 500 in the United States)
8 June – Margaret Nevinson, suffrage campaigner, 74
28 June – Thomas Phillips Price, landowner, industrialist and politician, 88
9 July – John Owen Williams (Pedrog), minister and poet
10 July – Martha Hughes Cannon, Welsh-born US physician, politician and campaigner, 75
20 July – Bill Beynon, British bantamweight boxing champion, 41 (killed in mining accident)
23 July – Tenby Davies, half-mile world champion runner, 48
30 August – Conway Rees, Wales rugby union international, 62
11 September – Aneurin Rees Wales rugby union international, 74
16 September – Peg Entwistle, actress, 24 (suicide)
26 October – William Howell Davies, merchant and politician, 80
25 November 
John Williams, recipient of the Victoria Cross, 75
Hugh Hughes, trade union leader, 54

See also
1932 in Northern Ireland

References

Wales